Pir Lujeh (also Romanized as Pīr Lūjeh; also known as Parichah and Paricheh) is a village in Abbas-e Sharqi Rural District, Tekmeh Dash District, Bostanabad County, East Azerbaijan Province, Iran. As of the 2006 census, its population was 114 people in 23 families.

References 

Populated places in Bostanabad County